Nova Vas is a village in Istria County, Croatia. Administratively it belongs to the municipality of Kršan. The village is inhabited mostly by Istro-Romanians.

Population

References

External links 
Official homepage of Kršan
Tourist homepage

Populated places in Istria County
Istro-Romanian settlements